Golden Corners is an unincorporated community in Wayne County, in the U.S. state of Ohio.

History
A post office called Golden Corners was established in 1854, and remained in operation until 1901. In 1910, Golden Corners was one of five communities within Canaan Township.

References

Unincorporated communities in Wayne County, Ohio
Unincorporated communities in Ohio